Malowal (مالووال) is a village in Tehsil Gujrat, northeast Pakistan situated in union council Karianwala in Gujrat District. Malowal is an ancient village named after a pioneer who was one of the richest people in the area of that time named Malo hence the village being called Malowal. Malo by caste was a gujjar which is the main caste of the village. Other Casts include Malik, taili, kasabi, tarkhan, etc., as well as one syed family who are well respected and are the descendents of Prophet Muhammad. Notable people of the village Include Syed Qamar Shah who is a well known police officer and his family who are saints, and others who are mainly gujjar. Malowal is a really big village with a lot of farmers, though now the occupation as a farmer isn't as prominent as many residents of the village reside abroad which include members of all castes and members of the Syed family from which most reside in either a part of Europe, Canada, America or Arab countries in the Persian Gulf. Villages near Malowal include Haji wala, pero shah, santal, surkian, damthal, jinder sharif, meeran chak, and others. Malowal also borders azad kashmir

Malowal Village has both Girls' and Boys' Schools.

References

Populated places in Gujrat District